Donacoscaptes semivittalis is a moth in the family Crambidae. It was described by Paul Dognin in 1907. It is found in Peru.

References

Haimbachiini
Moths described in 1907